Payao Poontarat (October 18, 1956 – August 13, 2006) was a Thai boxer who, at the age of 18, won the bronze medal in the men's Light flyweight (-48 kg) category at the 1976 Summer Olympics. He was the first Thai athlete to win an Olympic medal in any sport.

1976 Olympic results
Below is the record of Payao Poontarat, a Thai light flyweight boxer who competed at the 1976 Montreal Olympics:

 Defeated Remus Cosma (Romania) by decision, 4-1
 Defeated Aleksandr Tkachenko (Soviet Union) by decision, 3-2
 Defeated György Gedó (Hungary) by decision, 4-1
 Lost to Li Byong-Uk (North Korea) referee stooped contest in the second round (was awarded a bronze medal)

Boxing career
Born in the village of Bang Sapan, Prachuap Khiri Khan, Phayao Poontarat came from a poor family. As a child, he sold flowers in the resort city of Pattaya to help support his younger siblings. Like many poor boys in Thailand, he took up Muay Thai, and he proved to be a gifted boxer under the ring name "Petchpayao Sitkrutat" (เพชรพะเยาว์ ศิษย์ครูทัศน์). He switched to international boxing and won a place on the Thai Olympic team in 1976. Though he finished with a bronze medal, Phayao gained attention by defeating the 1972 Olympic gold medal winner, Gyogy Gedo, in the quarter finals. He trained hard for the 1980 Moscow Olympics, but his hopes for a gold were ended by the United States led boycott over of the Soviet Union's invasion of Afghanistan. Instead, he turned professional and on November 27, 1983 became WBC superflyweight world champion by defeating Rafael Orono of Venezuela in a split decision. In his first title defence, against Guty Espadas of Mexico, Phayao was behind on all the score cards, but saved his championship belt with a 10th-round knockout. Phayao was then challenged by Japan's Jiro Watanabe and agreed to meet him. When they met in Osaka on July 5, 1984  Phayao lost by a controversial 12-round decision. The World Boxing Council viewed the tape and ordered a rematch. It took place in November, with Phayao losing by a technical knockout in the 11th round.

Political career
Giving up boxing, Phayao Poontarat became a Thai policeman with the rank of captain. He joined  the Democrat Party and in 2001 was elected as member of parliament for his home-province.

Personal life and death

In 2002, he began to suffer from amyotrophic lateral sclerosis, also known as Lou Gehrig's disease. The disease is incurable. In 2006, Phayao died at the age of 48 at Siriraj Hospital in Bangkok. He was survived by his wife and several children.

Professional boxing record

Muay Thai record

|-  style="background:#cfc;"
| 1980-07-07|| Win||align=left| Somnoi Bankhod || Lumpinee Stadium || Bangkok, Thailand || Decision || 5 ||3:00

|-  style="background:#fbb;"
| 1978-04-|| Loss||align=left| Singthong Prasopchai || Lumpinee Stadium || Bangkok, Thailand || Decision || 5 ||3:00

|-  style="background:#fbb;"
| 1977-11-17|| Loss||align=left| Orachunnoi Hor Mahachai || Rajadamnern Stadium || Bangkok, Thailand || Decision || 5 ||3:00

|-  style="background:#;"
| 1977-09-09|| ||align=left| Singthong Prasopchai || Lumpinee Stadium || Bangkok, Thailand || Decision || 5 ||3:00

|-  style="background:#;"
| 1977-04-04|| ||align=left| Phanomthian Sakmanuchai || Rajadamnern Stadium || Bangkok, Thailand || ||  ||

|-  style="background:#fbb;"
| 1975-04-07|| Loss||align=left| Anantachai Singbangsaen || Rajadamnern Stadium || Bangkok, Thailand || Decision || 5 ||3:00

|-
| colspan=9 | Legend:

References

External links
 
Professional record on Cyber Zone Boxing Encyclopedia
Bangkok Post obituary
New York Times obituary

1957 births
2006 deaths
Neurological disease deaths in Thailand
Deaths from motor neuron disease
Boxers at the 1976 Summer Olympics
Payao Poontarat
Payao Poontarat
Super-flyweight boxers
World super-flyweight boxing champions
World Boxing Council champions
Payao Poontarat
Payao Poontarat
Payao Poontarat
Olympic medalists in boxing
Payao Poontarat
Payao Poontarat
Medalists at the 1976 Summer Olympics
Southeast Asian Games medalists in boxing